Three Walls is a Canadian documentary film, directed by Zaheed Mawani and released in 2011. Made as part of Mawani's graduate thesis for the film studies program at York University, the film presents a humorous look at the history of the office cubicle.

The film premiered at the 2011 Palm Beach International Film Festival, and was a Canadian Screen Award nominee for Best Short Documentary Film at the 1st Canadian Screen Awards.

References

External links
 

2011 films
2011 short documentary films
Canadian short documentary films
2010s English-language films
2010s Canadian films